Nina Gagen-Torn (— June 4, 1986) was a Russian and Soviet poet, writer, historian and ethnographer. Most of her research was in the area of ethnography of the peoples of the Soviet Union, Russian and Bulgarian folklore, and the history of the Russian ethnography

Biography
She was born in St. Petersburg to a noble (dvoryan) family of baron Ivan Eduardovich Gagen-Torn, physician, Russified Swede. She graduated from the Petrograd Institute of Geography and post-graduate course of  the Petrograd University (1924). She was a lecturer, worked in the Museum of Ethnography and was secretary of the magazine Soviet Ethnography (1934).

During the Great Purge, she spent the years of 1936–1942 in Kolyma labor camps (Sevvostlag "Directorate of Northeastern Camps") and 1942–1943 in exile. In 1946, she earned the degree of kandidat in ethnography with thesis "Elements of Dress of Volga Peoples as a Material for Ethnogenesis". She was repressed for the second time during 1947-1952 and served in Mordovia (Temlag, reorganized into Dubravlag in 1948)  After serving the term, she was permanently exiled to Yenisey. With the end of the Stalinist era, she was amnestied on April 16, 1954, and fully rehabilitated in 1956.

From 1964, she devoted herself to the study of The Tale of Igor's Campaign and put forth a number of original hypotheses.

Most of her research was in the area of ethnography of the peoples of the Soviet Union, Russian and Bulgarian folklore, and the history of the Russian ethnography. She also published short stories and poems. Two booklets of her poems were published posthumously.

Notes

References

External links
Nina Gagen-Torn  at dragilev.ru 
Nina Gagen-Torn at feb-web.ru 
Nina Gagen-Torn at memory.pvost.org 
Sample poems written in gulag  at prison.org 

1900 births
1986 deaths
Ethnographers
Soviet historians
Russian women poets
Soviet women poets
Russian people of Swedish descent
20th-century Russian women writers
Writers from Saint Petersburg
Soviet rehabilitations
20th-century Russian poets
Russian women anthropologists
Women historians
Dubravlag detainees